Peppermill or peppermills may refer to:
Pepper grinder
Peppermill Las Vegas in Winchester, Nevada
Peppermill Reno in Reno, Nevada
Peppermill Wendover in West Wendover, Nevada
Peppermills (1997 film)
Peppermill restaurant in Nieuwerkerken, Limburg, Belgie